The 2013 Giro del Trentino Alto Adige-Südtirol is a women's cycling stage race in Italy. It was rated by the UCI as category 2.1, and was held between 15 and 16 June 2013.

Stages

Stage 1a (TTT) 
15 June 2013 – Revò to Lauregno

Stage 1b
15 June 2013 – Termon to Termon

Stage 2
16 June 2013 – San Romedio to Sarnonico 

Tour of the Alps
2013 in Italian sport
2013 in women's road cycling